Live at Austin City Limits Festival  by Northern Irish singer-songwriter Van Morrison is a limited edition live album recorded from the Austin City Limits Festival concert at which he was the first night headliner on 15 September 2006. It has only been made available at live Van Morrison concerts and from the Van Morrison official website.

The September appearance at the Austin City Limits Festival was at the closing end of a tour to promote his 2006 released country and western album Pay the Devil.  The tour had begun on 7 March 2006 with Morrison's first ever concert at the famed Ryman Auditorium.

His performance at the festival was rated as one of the 10 Best Shows at Austin City Limits by Rolling Stone and the two disc CD features the complete concert.

Track listing
(All songs by Van Morrison, except as noted)

Disc one
"Back on Top" – 5:45
"Big Blue Diamonds" (Earl J. Carson) – 3:06
"Playhouse" – 5:30
"Days Like This" – 3:02
"Muleskinner Blues" (Jimmie Rodgers, Georgie Vaughn) – 5:49
"In the Midnight" – 5:24
"Bright Side of the Road" – 4:29
"Don't You Make Me High" (Daniel Barker, Ken Harris) – 3:05
"Cleaning Windows" – 4:37
"I Can't Stop Loving You" (Don Gibson) – 5:32

Disc two
"Real Real Gone/You Send Me" (Morrison), (Sam Cooke) – 5:36 
"Saint James Infirmary" (traditional arranged by Morrison) – 5:28
"Moondance" – 6:20
"It's All in the Game/You Know What They're Writing About/Make It Real One More Time" (Charles Dawes, Carl Sigman), (Morrison) – 7:21
"Precious Time" – 3:52
"Don't Start Crying Now/Custard Pie" (James Moore, Jerry West), (Sonny Terry) – 5:23
"Wild Night" – 4:18
"Brown Eyed Girl" – 4:21
"Gloria" – 8:46

Personnel
Van Morrison –  vocals, alto saxophone, ampli-coustic guitar, harmonica
Tony Fitzgibbon – violin 
John Allair – Hammond organ
Ned Edwards  – electric guitar
John Platania – electric guitar
Cindy Cashdollar – pedal steel, dobro  
David Hayes – bass
Neal Wilkinson – drums
Crawford Bell – backing vocals, acoustic guitar, trumpet
Karen Hammill – backing vocals
Janeen Daly – backing vocals

Notes

Albums produced by Van Morrison
Van Morrison live albums
2006 live albums